The shadow cabinet of Victoria is the opposition's equivalent to the Cabinet of Victoria. The shadow cabinet plays a big part in delivering an effective opposition. It consists of members of parliament who are given individual responsibilities for specific policy areas. This enables the opposition to present alternative viewpoints, scrutinise bills, and contribute to the lawmaking process in their specialised portfolios. In addition, it helps prepare the opposition for government should they win the next election by giving them the opportunity to develop their policy positions.

The current shadow cabinet, led by the Opposition Leader John Pesutto, was announced on 18 December 2022.

Current arrangement

See also
Shadow ministry of John Pesutto

Reference list

External links  
 Shadow Cabinet Directory

Victoria shadow ministries